The Republics of the Union of Soviet Socialist Republics or the Union Republics were  national-based administrative units of the Union of Soviet Socialist Republics (USSR). The Soviet Union was formed in 1922 by a treaty between the Soviet republics of Byelorussia, Russia, Transcaucasia, and Ukraine, by which they became its constituent republics.

For most of its history, the USSR was a highly centralized state despite its nominal structure as a federation of republics; the decentralization reforms during the era of perestroika and glasnost conducted by Mikhail Gorbachev are cited as one of the factors which led to the dissolution of the USSR in 1991 and the creation of the Commonwealth of Independent States.

There were two very distinct types of republics in the Soviet Union: the larger union republics, representing the main ethnic groups of the Union and with the constitutional right to secede from it, and the smaller autonomous republics, located within the union republics and representing ethnic minorities.

The Karelo-Finnish Soviet Socialist Republic, a relic of the Soviet-Finnish War, became the only union republic to be deprived of its status in 1956. The decision to downgrade Karelia to an autonomous republic within the RSFSR was made unilaterally by the central government without consulting its population.

Overview 

Chapter 8 of the 1977 Soviet Constitution is titled as the "Soviet Union is a union state". Article 70 stated that the union was founded on principles "socialist federalism" as a result of free self-determination of nation and volunteer association of equal in rights soviet socialist republics. Article 71 listed all of 15 union republics that united into the Soviet Union.

According to Article 76 of the 1977 Soviet Constitution, a Union Republic was a sovereign Soviet socialist state that had united with other Soviet Republics in the USSR. Article 78 of the Constitution stated that the territory of the union republic cannot be changed without its agreement. Article 81 of the Constitution stated that "the sovereign rights of Union Republics shall be safeguarded by the USSR".

In the final decades of its existence, the Soviet Union officially consisted of fifteen Soviet Socialist Republics (SSRs). All of them, with the exception of the Russian Federation (until 1990), had their own local party chapters of the All-Union Communist Party.

Outside the territory of the Russian Federation, the republics were constituted mostly in lands that had formerly belonged to the Russian Empire and had been acquired by it between the 1700 Great Northern War and the Anglo-Russian Convention of 1907.

In 1944, amendments to the All-Union Constitution allowed for separate branches of the Red Army for each Soviet Republic. They also allowed for Republic-level commissariats for foreign affairs and defense, allowing them to be recognized as de jure independent states in international law. This allowed for two Soviet Republics, Ukraine and Byelorussia, (as well as the USSR as a whole) to join the United Nations General Assembly as founding members in 1945.

All of the former Republics of the Union are now independent countries, with ten of them (all except the Baltic states, Georgia and Ukraine) being very loosely organized under the heading of the Commonwealth of Independent States. The Baltic states assert that their incorporation into the Soviet Union in 1940 (as the Lithuanian, Latvian, and Estonian SSRs) under the provisions of the 1939 Molotov–Ribbentrop Pact was illegal, and that they therefore remained independent countries under Soviet occupation. Their position is supported by the European Union, the European Court of Human Rights, the United Nations Human Rights Council and the United States. In contrast, the Russian government and state officials maintain that the Soviet annexation of the Baltic states was legitimate.

Constitutionally, the Soviet Union was a federation. In accordance with provisions present in its Constitution (versions adopted in 1924, 1936 and 1977), each republic retained the right to secede from the USSR. Throughout the Cold War, this right was widely considered to be meaningless; however, the corresponding Article 72 of the 1977 Constitution was used in December 1991 to effectively dissolve the Soviet Union, when Russia, Ukraine, and Belarus seceded from the Union. Although the Union was created under an initial ideological appearance of forming a supranational union, it never de facto functioned as one; an example of the ambiguity is that the Ukrainian Soviet Socialist Republic in the 1930s officially had its own foreign minister, but that office did not exercise any true sovereignty apart from that of the union. The Constitution of the Soviet Union in its various iterations defined the union as a federation with the right of the republics to secede. This constitutional status led to the possibility of the parade of sovereignties once the republic with de facto (albeit not de jure) dominance over the other republics, the Russian one, developed a prevailing political notion asserting that it would be better off if it seceded. The de facto dominance of the Russian republic is the reason that various historians (for example, Dmitri Volkogonov and others) have asserted that the union was a unitary state in fact albeit it not in law.

In practice, the USSR was a highly centralised entity from its creation in 1922 until the mid-1980s when political forces unleashed by reforms undertaken by Mikhail Gorbachev resulted in the loosening of central control and its ultimate dissolution. Under the constitution adopted in 1936 and modified along the way until October 1977, the political foundation of the Soviet Union was formed by the Soviets (Councils) of People's Deputies. These existed at all levels of the administrative hierarchy, with the Soviet Union as a whole under the nominal control of the Supreme Soviet of the USSR, located in Moscow within the Russian SFSR.

Along with the state administrative hierarchy, there existed a parallel structure of party organizations, which allowed the Politburo to exercise large amounts of control over the republics. State administrative organs took direction from the parallel party organs, and appointments of all party and state officials required approval of the central organs of the party.

Each republic had its own unique set of state symbols: a flag, a coat of arms, and, with the exception of Russia until 1990, an anthem. Every republic of the Soviet Union also was awarded with the Order of Lenin.

Union Republics of the Soviet Union 

The number of the union republics of the USSR varied from 4 to 16. From 1956 until its dissolution in 1991, the Soviet Union consisted of 15 Soviet Socialist Republics. (In 1956, the Karelo-Finnish Soviet Socialist Republic, created in 1940, was absorbed into the Russian Soviet Socialist Republic.) Rather than listing the republics in alphabetical order, the republics were listed in constitutional order, which, particularly by the last decades of the Soviet Union, did not correspond to order either by population or economic power.

Temporary Union Republics of the Soviet Union

Republics not recognized by the Soviet Union

Other non-union Soviet republics

The Turkestan Soviet Federative Republic was proclaimed in 1918 but did not survive to the founding of the USSR, becoming the short-lived Turkestan Autonomous Soviet Socialist Republic of the RSFSR. The Crimean Soviet Socialist Republic (Soviet Socialist Republic of Taurida) was also proclaimed in 1918, but did not become a union republic and was made into an autonomous republic of the RSFSR, although the Crimean Tatars had a relative majority until the 1930s or 1940s according to censuses. When the Tuvan People's Republic joined the Soviet Union in 1944, it did not become a union republic, and was instead established as an autonomous republic of the RSFSR.

The leader of the People's Republic of Bulgaria, Todor Zhivkov, suggested in the early 1960s that the country should become a union republic, but the offer was rejected. During the Soviet–Afghan War, the Soviet Union proposed to annex Northern Afghanistan as its 16th union republic in what was to become the Afghan Soviet Socialist Republic.

Unrealized Soviet states
 Bessarabian Soviet Socialist Republic (1919)
 Polish Soviet Socialist Republic (1920)
 East Polish Soviet Socialist Republic (1990)

Autonomous Republics of the Soviet Union 

Several of the Union Republics themselves, most notably Russia, were further subdivided into Autonomous Soviet Socialist Republics (ASSRs). Though administratively part of their respective Union Republics, ASSRs were also established based on ethnic/cultural lines.

According to the constitution of the USSR, autonomous republics, autonomous oblasts and autonomous okrugs had the right, by means of a referendum, to independently resolve the issue of staying in the USSR or in the seceding union republic, as well as to raise the issue of their state-legal status.

Former Autonomous Soviet Socialist Republics of the Soviet Union

Dissolution of the Soviet Union 

Starting in the late 1980s, under the rule of Mikhail Gorbachev, the Soviet government undertook a program of political reforms (glasnost and perestroika) intended to liberalise and revitalise the Union. These measures, however, had a number of unintended political and social effects. Political liberalisation allowed the governments of the union republics to openly invoke the principles of democracy and nationalism to gain legitimacy. In addition, the loosening of political restrictions led to fractures within the Communist Party which resulted in a reduced ability to govern the Union effectively. The rise of nationalist and right-wing movements, notably led by Boris Yeltsin in Russia, in the previously homogeneous political system undermined the Union's foundations. With the central role of the Communist Party removed from the constitution, the Party lost its control over the State machinery and was banned from operating after an attempted coup d'état.

Throughout this period of turmoil, the Soviet government attempted to find a new structure that would reflect the increased authority of the republics. Some autonomous republics, like Tatarstan, Checheno-Ingushetia, Abkhazia, South Ossetia, Crimea, Transnistria, Gagauzia sought the union statute in the New Union Treaty. Efforts to found a Union of Sovereign States, however, proved unsuccessful and the republics began to secede from the Union. By 6 September 1991, the Soviet Union's State Council recognized the independence of Estonia, Latvia and Lithuania bringing the number of union republics down to 12. On 8 December 1991, the remaining leaders of the republics signed the Belavezha Accords which agreed that the USSR would be dissolved and replaced with a Commonwealth of Independent States. On 25 December, President Gorbachev announced his resignation and turned all executive powers over to Yeltsin. The next day the Council of Republics voted to dissolve the Union. Since then, the republics have been governed independently with some reconstituting themselves as liberal parliamentary republics and others, particularly in Central Asia, devolving into highly autocratic states under the leadership of the old Party elite.

See also 

 Flags of the Soviet Republics
 Emblems of the Soviet Republics
 Commonwealth of Independent States
 Eurasian Economic Union
 National delimitation in the Soviet Union
 Bavarian Soviet Republic
 Hungarian Soviet Republic
 Slovak Soviet Republic
 Limerick Soviet
 Paris Commune
 Provisional Polish Revolutionary Committee (Polish SSR)
 Republics of Russia
 Federal subjects of Russia
 Post-Soviet states (former Soviet Republics)

Notes

References

Further reading
 Bibliography of the Russian Revolution and Civil War
 Bibliography of Stalinism and the Soviet Union
 Bibliography of the Post Stalinist Soviet Union

 
.
R
.
Republics
Decentralization

Russian-speaking countries and territories